Bikrampur ("City of Courage") was a pargana situated  south of Dhaka, the modern capital city of Bangladesh. In the present day, it is known as Munshiganj District of Bangladesh. It is a historic region in Bengal and was a part of the Bhawal Estate.

History

Early history
Ashoka, the emperor of the Maurya Dynasty, ruled all of major parts of Bengal from ca. 269 BC to 232 BC. Being a devotee of Gautama Buddha, he propagated Buddhism across his kingdom which included Bikrampur to the east. Following the high ideals of this religion, Pala Kings came to Bikrampur to rule the region.

Pala Era
The second ruler of Pala Empire, Dharmapal, built a Buddhist monastery in Bikrampur during his reign in 770–810. After his death, his son, Devapala ruled this area until 850 CE. Then the region is successively ruled by Vigrahapala I, Narayanapala, Rajyapala, Gopala II, Vigrahapala II, Mahipala, Naya Pala, Vigrahapala III, Mahipala II, Shurapala II, Ramapala, Kumarapala, Gopala III and Madanapala. Pala empire disintegrated in 1174 weakened by attacks of the Sena dynasty.

Chandra Era
During the rule of Srichandra (reigned 930 – 975 AD), the administrative centre of the Chandra kingdom was established at Bikrampur. The Varman Dynasty (1035-1150 CE) replaced Chandras and established their independent kingdom.

Varman Era
After the fall of Chandras, The Varmans Dynasty became powerful in East Bengal. The Varmans claimed that they descended from a branch of Yadava Dynasty of Simhapur. Jat Varman, Hari Varman Samala Varman were the powerful rulers, who ruled in Bikrampur. Bhoja Varman was the last independent ruler of Varman Dynasty who was defeated by Vijaysena of Sena Dynasty.

Sen Era
A copper-plate inscription from the time of the ruler Vijay Sen (ruled 1097–1160), founder of Sen dynasty, was found in Barrackpore, in 1911. In this inscription, Bikrampur was mentioned as the capital of that region. It continued to be the capital throughout the, Sena Dynasty. In 1205, Turkic invader Bakhtiyar Khalji defeated the then-ruler Lakshman Sen in Nadia. Lakshman fled to Bikrampur. His two sons Vishwarup Sen and Keshab Sen kept ruling from here until 1230. But the copper-plate inscriptions during their reign do not mention Bikrampur as the capital.
Another Hindu ruler, Danuj Rai, defeated a successor of Keshab Sen and started ruling from here. In early 1280 he moved the capital to Suvarnagrama (later named Sonargaon).

Mughal Era
Emperor Akbar established Bikrampur as one of the 52 parganas of Sonargaon sarkar in Bengal subah during his administrative reforms in 1572–1580. During his time, Chand Rai and Kedar Rai were the Zamindars of Bikramapur. In the expeditions against Bara-Bhuiyans, Mughal Subahdar Man Singh killed Kedar Rai in early 1600s.

In post-Aurangzeb era, during the time of Nawab Murshid Quli Khan, Bikrampur was divided into eight taluks – Bhagyakul, Sreenagar, Maijpara, Sinhapara, Taltala, Sirajdikhan, Louhajong and Baligaon. Each taluk was represented by one Zamindar. Muhammad Azim Khan became the Zamindar of Louhajong who held the title of "Khan Bahadur". Gobinda Prasad Roy became the Zamindar of Maijpara.

Notable people 

 Fakhruddin Ahmed (born 1940)
 Iajuddin Ahmed (1931–2012)
 Atiśa Dīpankara Śrījñāna ( CE)
 Asit Sen (1922–2001)
 Humayun Azad (1947–2004)
 Bhanu Bandopadhyay (1920–1983)
 Manik Bandopadhyay (19 May 1908 – 3 December 1956)
 Pratima Bandopadhyay (1934–2004)
 Atin Bandyopadhyay (1934–2019)
 Kedareswar Banerjee (1900–1975) 
 Rameshwar Banerjee (8 February 1925 – 21 November 1945)
 Benoy Basu (1908–1930)
 Samaresh Basu (1924–1988)
 Jagadish Chandra Bose (1858–1937)
 Nripen Chakraborty (1905–2004)
 Moushumi Chatterjee (born 26 April 1948)
 Sabitri Chatterjee (born 22 February 1937)
 Aghorenath Chattopadhyay
 Nishikanta Chattopadhyay
 Soorjo Coomar Goodeve Chuckerbutty (1826–1874)
 Brojen Das (1927–1998)
 Chittaranjan Das (1870–1925)
 Durga Mohan Das (1841–1897)
 Jibanananda Das
 Narayan Debnath (born 1925)
 Dwarkanath Ganguly (1844–1898)
 Suhasini Ganguly (1909–1965)
 Kaliprosanna Ghosh (1843–1910)
 Prafulla Chandra Ghosh (1891–1983)
 Badal Gupta (1912–1930)
 Dinesh Gupta (1911–1931)
 Jogendranath Gupta (1883–1965)
 Chashi Nazrul Islam (1941–2015)
 Radhu Karmakar (1919–1993)
 Muhammad Hamidullah Khan (1938–2011)
 Prasanta Chandra Mahalanobis (1893–1972)
 Imdadul Haq Milan (born 1955)
 Ashutosh Mukhopadhyay (1920–1989)
 Shirshendu Mukhopadhyay (born 1935)
 Sarojini Naidu (1879–1949)
 A. K. A. Firoze Noon (1946–2006)
 Kedar Ray
 Siddhartha Shankar Ray (1920–2010)
 Mokshadacharan Samadhyayi 
 Laboni Sarkar
 Soham Swami (1858–1918)
 Sarada Ukil (1888–1940)

See also
 Munshiganj Vihara

References

External links
 Historical Bikrampur

Munshiganj District
Buddhist sites in Bangladesh
Historical regions in Bangladesh